Le Voyage is the fourteenth studio album by Christian singer Sandi Patti, released in 1993 on Word Records. It's a concept album and it tells the story,  done in a musical setting, featuring Patti as a character named Traveler, and she comes from a long line of Sojouners. It has been described as a modern retelling of Pilgrim's Progress featuring songs about traveling on a journey of faith. Le Voyage continues her inspirational sound but also adds some upbeat pop and adult contemporary sounds as well. Patti re-records a new version of "Unexpected Friends," originally from her 1990 album Another Time...Another Place and also features a duet with fellow Christian singer/songwriter and former Kansas lead singer John Elefante called "Home Will Find You." This would be the last album using her last name "Patti." Patti also released a companion book to go with the album. The album would top the Billboard Top Christian Albums chart and was nominated for a Grammy Award for Best Pop/Contemporary Gospel Album. In 1994, her music video for the first single "Hand On My Shoulder" won Short Form Music Video of the Year at the 25th GMA Dove Awards.

Track listing

All songs written by Greg Nelson and Bob Farrell.

 "Prologue" (instrumental) - 3:01
 "Little Narrow Gate" - 4:21
 "Home Will Find You" (duet with John Elefante) - 4:12
 "Long Look" - 3:44
 "Hand on My Shoulder" - 5:15
 "All the Stars" - 5:06
 "The Dilemma" - 5:03
 "Forest of Fears" - 5:19
 "In the Tenderlands" - 4:34
 "Unexpected Friends" - 3:40
 "Theme from The City of Rest" (instrumental) - 3:36
 "Love Can Open the Door" - 3:44
 "No Place to Lay My Head" - 6:11

Personnel 
 Sandi Patti – vocals (2-10, 12, 13)
 Eric Persing – synthesizer programming 
 David Hamilton – synthesizers (1), arrangements (1), string arrangements and conductor (1), keyboards (5), concept (11)
 Robbie Buchanan – acoustic piano (2-5), arrangements (2-6, 8, 11, 12), keyboards (4-8), programming (11, 12)
 Blair Masters – synthesizers (2, 10)
 Phil Naish – synthesizers (3)
 David Huntsinger – acoustic piano (10, 13)
 Tom Hemby – guitars (1, 3, 4, 6-9, 11)
 Dann Huff – guitars (2-5, 7, 11, 12)
 Jackie Street – bass (3, 4, 5, 7, 8, 11)
 Gary Lunn – bass (9)
 Paul Leim – drums (3-8, 11)
 Farrell Morris – percussion (3, 6, 7, 11)
 Tom McAninch – French horn (1)
 Eberhard Ramm – French horn (1)
 Joy Worland – French horn (1)
 Pamela Sixfin – violin solo (1)
 Mark Douthit – saxophone (6, 8)
 Sam Levine – soprano saxophone (9)
 Nashville String Machine – strings (1, 2, 5, 9, 10, 11, 13)
 Carl Gorodetzky – orchestra contractor (1, 2, 5, 9, 10, 11, 13)
 Greg Nelson – arrangements (1, 7, 9, 10, 13)
 Jeremy Lubbock – string arrangements and conductor (2, 5, 10, 11, 13)
 Ronn Huff – string arrangements and conductor (9)
 John Elefante – vocals (3)
 Alan Moore – BGV arrangements (3, 4, 12)
 Bob Carlisle – backing vocals (3, 12)
 Beverly Darnall – backing vocals (3, 12)
 Michael Eldred – backing vocals (3, 12)
 Lisa Glasgow – backing vocals (3, 12)
 Mark Ivey – backing vocals (3)
 Tammy Jensen – backing vocals (3, 12)
 Bonnie Keen – backing vocals (3, 12)
 Ellen Musick – backing vocals (3, 12)
 Guy Penrod – backing vocals (3, 12)
 Leah Taylor – backing vocals (3, 12)
 Mervyn Warren – backing vocals (3, 4, 12)
 Chris Willis – backing vocals (3, 12)
 Vicki Hampton – backing vocals (4)
 Donna McElroy – backing vocals (4)

Production
 Matt Baugher – executive producer 
 Greg Nelson – producer 
 Bill Deaton – engineer, vocal engineer, mixing 
 Bob Clark – string engineer
 Brent King – string engineer, vocal engineer 
 Chip Birge – assistant engineer, mix assistant 
 Robert Charles – assistant engineer
 Todd Little – assistant engineer
 Carry Summers – assistant engineer
 Greg Parker – mix assistant 
 Doug Sax – mastering at The Mastering Lab (Hollywood, California)
 Holly Krig-Smith – production coordinator 
 Loren Balman – art direction 
 Patrick Pollei – art direction, design 
 Neill Whitlock – photography

Charts

Radio singles

Accolades
GMA Dove Awards

References

1993 albums
Sandi Patty albums
Word Records albums